(born 13 March 1977) is a Japanese actor and model born in Ehime, Japan. He started his modelling career in Japan, but has expanded his range to China and South Korea.

Career

Stage
 Anti Real

Film
Shiawase nara Te wo tatakou(2005)
Akihabara@Deep(2006)
 Waruboro(2007)
Kannou-Shousetu(2007)
The Magic Hour (2008)

Television dramas
Kamen Rider W
MTV SHIBUHARA GIRLS2
NHK BS premium Cambrian Wars
BeeTV Mitsu-Fechi

Music Videos 
Mariah Carey [Boy (I Need You)]
Yuki [Humming Bird]
Hideaki Tokunaga [Anatashika Mienakatta]

Online Game 
REQUIEM

References

External links 
Management Office DOMO 

1977 births
Living people
Japanese male models
Japanese male film actors
Japanese male television actors